Billboard Pop Memories is a series of compilation albums released by Rhino Records in 1994, each featuring ten hit recordings spanning a five- or ten-year period from the 1920s through the 1950s.

The tracks from the 1940s and 1950s compilations were major hits on the various Billboard magazine best-sellers, jockeys and jukebox charts.

As the rock era moved into full swing, chronologically the series continues with "lighter" hits from the 1960s in the Billboard Top Pop Hits series of albums. These were followed up by sets of adult contemporary and easy listening music from 1970 through 1974 with the Billboard Top Soft Rock Hits series.

The 1920s

"Valencia" - Paul Whiteman & His Orchestra
"My Blue Heaven" - Gene Austin
"Sonny Boy" - Al Jolson
"Charmaine!" - Guy Lombardo & His Royal Canadians
"The Prisoner's Song" - Vernon Dalhart
"Whispering" - Paul Whiteman & His Ambassador Orchestra
"April Showers" - Al Jolson
"Swingin' Down the Lane" - Isham Jones Orchestra
"Ramona" - Gene Austin
"Dardanella" - Selvin's Novelty Orchestra

The 1930s

"Begin the Beguine" - Artie Shaw and His Orchestra
"Deep Purple" - Larry Clinton and His Orchestra
"Sing, Sing, Sing (With a Swing)" - Benny Goodman and His Orchestra
"Pennies from Heaven" - Bing Crosby
"The Stein Song (University of Maine)" - Rudy Vallée and His Connecticut Yankees
"Boo-Hoo" - Guy Lombardo and His Royal Canadians
"Night and Day" - Leo Reisman and His Orchestra
"Mood Indigo" - Duke Ellington and His Cotton Club Orchestra
"Over the Rainbow" - Judy Garland
"Moonlight Serenade" - Glenn Miller and His Orchestra

1940–1944

"I've Heard That Song Before" - Harry James & His Orchestra
"Frenesi" - Artie Shaw & His Orchestra
"Paper Doll" - The Mills Brothers
"Swinging on a Star" - Bing Crosby, John Trotter and The Williams Brothers Quartet
"I'll Never Smile Again" - Tommy Dorsey & His Orchestra
"Amapola" - Jimmy Dorsey & His Orchestra with Bob Eberly
"You'll Never Know" - Dick Haymes & The Song Spinners
"Don't Fence Me In" - Bing Crosby & The Andrews Sisters
"In the Mood" - Glenn Miller & His Orchestra
"Stardust" - Artie Shaw & His Orchestra

1945–1949

"Riders in the Sky (A Cowboy Legend)" - Vaughn Monroe & His Orchestra
"Mañana (Is Soon Enough for Me)" - Peggy Lee
"Heartaches" - Ted Weems & His Orchestra
"The Old Lamp-Lighter" - Sammy Kaye
"My Dreams Are Getting Better All the Time" - Les Brown & His Orchestra
"The Gypsy" - The Ink Spots
"Buttons and Bows" - Dinah Shore and Her Happy Valley Boys
"Rumors Are Flying" - Frankie Carle & His Orchestra
"Cruising Down the River" - Russ Morgan & His Orchestra
"Sentimental Journey" - Les Brown & His Orchestra

1950–1954

"Rags To Riches" - Tony Bennett
"The Tennessee Waltz" - Patti Page
"The Song from Moulin Rouge (Where Is Your Heart)" - Percy Faith & His Orchestra
"How High the Moon" - Les Paul and Mary Ford
"You Belong to Me" - Jo Stafford
"Cry" - Johnnie Ray and The Four Lads
"Wheel of Fortune" - Kay Starr
"Oh! My Pa-Pa (Oh Mein Papa)" - Eddie Fisher
"Come On-A My House" - Rosemary Clooney
"Goodnight Irene" - Gordon Jenkins and The Weavers

1955–1959

"Memories Are Made of This" — Dean Martin
"The Wayward Wind" — Gogi Grant
"Unchained Melody" — Les Baxter
"Love Letters in the Sand" — Pat Boone
"It's All in the Game" — Tommy Edwards
"Love Is a Many-Splendored Thing" — Four Aces
"Cherry Pink and Apple Blossom White (Cerezo Rosa)" — Perez "Prez" Prado & His Orchestra
"Sleep Walk" — Santo & Johnny
"Sincerely" — The McGuire Sisters
"Moonglow and Theme from Picnic" — Morris Stoloff

Pop Memories
1994 compilation albums
Pop compilation albums
Various artists albums